The Eurofighter Typhoon is a European multinational twin-engine, canard delta wing, multirole fighter. The Typhoon was designed originally as an air-superiority fighter and is manufactured by a consortium of Airbus, BAE Systems and Leonardo that conducts the majority of the project through a joint holding company, Eurofighter Jagdflugzeug GmbH. The NATO Eurofighter and Tornado Management Agency, representing the UK, Germany, Italy and Spain, manages the project and is the prime customer.

The aircraft's development effectively began in 1983 with the Future European Fighter Aircraft programme, a multinational collaboration among the UK, Germany, France, Italy and Spain. Previously, Germany, Italy and the UK had jointly developed and deployed the Panavia Tornado combat aircraft and desired to collaborate on a new project, with additional participating EU nations. However disagreements over design authority and operational requirements led France to leave the consortium to develop the Dassault Rafale independently. A technology demonstration aircraft, the British Aerospace EAP, first flew on 6August 1986; a Eurofighter prototype made its maiden flight on 27 March 1994. The aircraft's name, Typhoon, was adopted in September 1998 and the first production contracts were also signed that year.

The sudden end of the Cold War reduced European demand for fighter aircraft and led to debate over the aircraft's cost and work share and protracted the Typhoon's development: the Typhoon entered operational service in 2003 and is now in service with the air forces of Austria, Italy, Germany, the United Kingdom, Spain, Saudi Arabia and Oman. Kuwait and Qatar have also ordered the aircraft, bringing the procurement total to 623 aircraft .

The Eurofighter Typhoon is a highly agile aircraft, designed to be an effective dogfighter in combat. Later production aircraft have been increasingly better equipped to undertake air-to-surface strike missions and to be compatible with an increasing number of different armaments and equipment, including Storm Shadow, Brimstone and Marte ER missiles. The Typhoon had its combat debut during the 2011 military intervention in Libya with the UK's Royal Air Force (RAF) and the Italian Air Force, performing aerial reconnaissance and ground-strike missions. The type has also taken primary responsibility for air-defence duties for the majority of customer nations.

Development

Origins

In the UK, as early as 1971, work commenced on the development of a manoeuvrable, tactical aircraft to replace the SEPECAT Jaguar (that was then about to enter service with the RAF). This work soon expanded to include an air superiority capability. A specification titled Air Staff Target 403 (AST 403), in 1972, led to the Hawker P.96, an unbuilt design with a relatively conventional planform, including a separate tail structure, in the late 1970s.

Simultaneously, in West Germany, the requirement for a new fighter had resulted in competition between Dornier, VFW-Fokker and Messerschmitt-Bölkow-Blohm (MBB) for a future Luftwaffe contract known as Taktisches Kampfflugzeug 90 ("Tactical Combat Aircraft 90"; TKF-90). Dornier collaborated with Northrop in the US on an acclaimed, but unsuccessful design, known as the :de:Northrop-Dornier ND-102. MBB was successful, with a design including a cranked delta wing, close-coupled-canard controls, and artificial stability.

In 1979, MBB and British Aerospace (BAe) presented a formal proposal to their respective governments for a collaboration, to be known as the European Collaborative Fighter, or European Combat Fighter (ECF). In October 1979, French firm Dassault joined the ECF project. It was at this stage of development the Eurofighter name was first attached to the aircraft. However, the development of three separate prototypes continued: MBB continued to refine its TKF-90 concept, and Dassault produced a design known as the ACX.

In the meantime, while the P.96 would have met the original UK specification, it had been cancelled because it was considered to offer little potential for future upgrades and redevelopment. In addition, there was a feeling within the UK aircraft industry that the P.96 would have been too similar to the McDonnell Douglas F/A-18 Hornet, which was then known to be at an advanced stage of development. The P.96 would not have been available until long after the Hornet, which would therefore likely have met and closed off most potential export markets for the P.96. BAe then produced two new proposals: the P.106B, a single-engined lightweight fighter, superficially resembling the JAS 39 Gripen, and the twin-engine P.110. The RAF rejected the P.106 concept on the grounds it had "half the effectiveness of the two-engined aircraft at two-thirds of the cost".

The ECF project collapsed in 1981 for several reasons, including differing requirements, Dassault's insistence on "design leadership" and the British preference for a new version of the RB199 to power the aircraft versus the French preference for the new Snecma M88.

Consequently, the Panavia partners (MBB, BAe and Aeritalia) launched the Agile Combat Aircraft (ACA) programme in April 1982. BAe designers agreed with the overall configuration of the proposed MBB TKF-90, although they rejected some of its more ambitious features such as engine vectoring nozzles and vented trailing edge controls – a form of boundary layer control.  The ACA, like the BAe P.110, had a cranked delta wing, canards and a twin tail. One major external difference was the replacement of the side-mounted engine intakes with a chin intake. The ACA was to be powered by a modified version of the RB199. The German and Italian governments withdrew funding, and the UK Ministry of Defence (MoD) agreed to fund 50% of the cost with the remaining 50% to be provided by industry. MBB and Aeritalia signed up and it was agreed that the aircraft would be produced at two sites: BAe Warton and a MBB factory in Germany. In May 1983, BAe announced a contract with the MoD for the development and production of an ACA demonstrator, the Experimental Aircraft Programme.

In 1983, Italy, Germany, France, the UK and Spain launched the "Future European Fighter Aircraft" (FEFA) programme. The aircraft was to have short take off and landing (STOL) and beyond visual range (BVR) capabilities. In 1984, France reiterated its requirement for a carrier-capable version and demanded a leading role. Italy, West Germany and the UK opted out and established a new EFA programme. In Turin on 2August 1985, West Germany, the UK and Italy agreed to go ahead with the Eurofighter; and confirmed France, along with Spain, had chosen not to proceed as a member of the project. Despite pressure from France, Spain rejoined the Eurofighter project in early September 1985. France officially withdrew from the project to pursue its own ACX project, which was to become the Dassault Rafale.

By 1986, the programme's cost had reached £180 million. When the EAP programme had started, the cost was supposed to be equally shared by government and industry, but the West German and Italian governments wavered on the agreement and the British government and private finance had to provide £100 million to keep the programme from ending. In April 1986, the British Aerospace EAP was rolled out at BAe Warton. The EAP first flew on 6August 1986. The Eurofighter bears a strong resemblance to the EAP. Design work continued over the next five years using data from the EAP. Initial requirements were: UK: 250 aircraft, Germany: 250, Italy: 165 and Spain: 100.  The share of the production work was divided among the countries in proportion to their projected procurement – BAe (33%), DASA (33%), Aeritalia (21%), and Construcciones Aeronáuticas SA (CASA) (13%).

The Munich-based Eurofighter Jagdflugzeug GmbH was established in 1986 to manage development of the project and EuroJet Turbo GmbH, the alliance of Rolls-Royce, MTU Aero Engines, FiatAvio (now Avio) and ITP for development of the EJ200. The aircraft was known as Eurofighter EFA from the late 1980s until it was renamed EF 2000 in 1992.

By 1990, the selection of the aircraft's radar had become a major stumbling-block. The UK, Italy and Spain supported the Ferranti Defence Systems-led ECR-90, while Germany preferred the APG-65-based MSD2000 (a collaboration between Hughes, AEG and GEC-Marconi). An agreement was reached after UK Defence Secretary Tom King assured his West German counterpart Gerhard Stoltenberg that the British government would approve the project and allow the GEC subsidiary Marconi Electronic Systems to acquire Ferranti Defence Systems from its parent, the Ferranti Group, which was in financial and legal difficulties. GEC thus withdrew its support for the MSD2000.

Delays

The financial burdens placed on Germany by reunification caused Helmut Kohl to make an election promise to cancel the Eurofighter. In early to mid-1991 German Defence Minister Volker Rühe sought to withdraw Germany from the project in favour of using Eurofighter technology in a cheaper, lighter plane. Because of the amount of money already spent on development, the number of jobs dependent on the project, and the binding commitments on each partner government, Kohl was unable to withdraw; "Rühe's predecessors had locked themselves into the project by a punitive penalty system of their own devising."

In 1995 concerns over workshare appeared. Since the formation of Eurofighter the workshare split had been agreed at 33/33/21/13 (United Kingdom/Germany/Italy/Spain) based on the number of units being ordered by each contributing nation, all the nations then reduced their orders. The UK cut its orders from 250 to 232, Germany from 250 to 140, Italy from 165 to 121 and Spain from 100 to 87. According to these order levels the workshare split should have been 39/24/22/15 UK/Germany/Italy/Spain, however Germany was unwilling to give up such a large amount of work. In January 1996, after much negotiation between German and UK partners, a compromise was reached whereby Germany would purchase another 40 aircraft. The workshare split was therefore UK 37.42%, Germany 29.03%, Italy 19.52% and Spain 14.03%.

At the 1996 Farnborough Airshow the UK announced funding for the construction phase of the project. On 22 December 1997 the defence ministers of the four partner nations signed the contract for production of the Eurofighter.

Testing

The maiden flight of the Eurofighter prototype took place in Bavaria on 27 March 1994, flown by DASA chief test pilot Peter Weger. In December 2004, Eurofighter Typhoon IPA4 began three months of Cold Environmental Trials (CET) at the Vidsel Air Base in Sweden, the purpose of which was to verify the operational behaviour of the aircraft and its systems in temperatures between −25 and 31 °C. The maiden flight of Instrumented Production Aircraft7 (IPA7), the first fully equipped Tranche2 aircraft, took place from EADS' Manching airfield on 16 January 2008.

Procurement, production and costs
The first production contract was signed on 30 January 1998 between Eurofighter GmbH, Eurojet and NETMA. The procurement totals were as follows: the UK 232, Germany 180, Italy 121, and Spain 87. Production was again allotted according to procurement: BAe (37.42%), DASA (29.03%), Aeritalia (19.52%), and CASA (14.03%).

On 2 September 1998, a naming ceremony was held at Farnborough, United Kingdom. This saw the Typhoon name formally adopted, initially for export aircraft only. The name continues the storm theme started by the Panavia Tornado. This was reportedly resisted by Germany; the Hawker Typhoon was a fighter-bomber aircraft used by the RAF during the Second World War to attack German targets. The name "Spitfire II" (after the famous British Second World War fighter, the Supermarine Spitfire) had also been considered and rejected for the same reason early in the development programme. In September 1998, contracts were signed for production of 148 Tranche1 aircraft and procurement of long lead-time items for Tranche2 aircraft. In March 2008, the final Tranche1 aircraft was delivered to the German Air Force. On 21 October 2008, the RAF's first two of 91 Tranche2 aircraft, were delivered to RAF Coningsby.

In July 2009, after almost 2 years of negotiations, the planned Tranche 3 purchase was split into 2 parts and the Tranche 3A contract was signed by the partner nations. The "Tranche 3B" order did not go ahead.

The Eurofighter Typhoon is unique in modern combat aircraft in that there are four separate assembly lines. Each partner company assembles its own national aircraft, but builds the same parts for all aircraft (including exports); Premium AEROTEC (main centre fuselage), EADS CASA (right wing, leading edge slats), BAE Systems (BAE) (front fuselage (including foreplanes), canopy, dorsal spine, tail fin, inboard flaperons, rear fuselage section) and Leonardo (left wing, outboard flaperons, rear fuselage sections).

Production is divided into three tranches (see table below). Tranches are a production/funding distinction, and do not imply an incremental increase in capability with each tranche. Tranche3 are based on late Tranche2 aircraft with improvements added. Tranche3 was split into A and B parts. Tranches were further divided up into production standard/capability blocks and funding/procurement batches, though these did not coincide, and are not the same thing; e.g., the Eurofighter designated FGR4 by the RAF is a Tranche 1, block 5. Batch1 covered block 1, but batch2 covered blocks 2, 2B and 5. On 25 May 2011 the 100th production aircraft, ZK315, rolled off the production line at Warton.

In 1985 the estimated cost of 250 UK aircraft was £7 billion. By 1997 the estimated cost was £17 billion; by 2003, £20 billion, and the in-service date (2003, defined as the date of delivery of the first aircraft to the RAF) was 54 months late. After 2003, the MoD refused to release updated cost-estimates on the grounds of commercial sensitivity. However, in 2011, the National Audit Office estimated the UK's "assessment, development, production and upgrade costs eventually hit £22.9 billion" and total programme costs would reach £37billion.

By 2007, Germany estimated the system cost (aircraft and training, plus spare parts) at €120million and said it was in perpetual increase. On 17 June 2009, Germany ordered 31 aircraft of Tranche 3A for €2.8billion, leading to a system cost of €90million per aircraft. The UK's Committee of Public Accounts reported that mismanagement of the project had helped increase the cost of each aircraft by seventy-five percent. The Spanish MoD put the cost of their Typhoon project up to December 2010 at €11.718billion, up from an original €9.255billion and implying a system cost for their 73 aircraft of €160million.

On 31 March 2009, a Eurofighter Typhoon fired an AIM-120 AMRAAM whilst having its radar in passive mode for the first time; the necessary target data for the missile was acquired by the radar of a second Eurofighter Typhoon and transmitted using the Multifunctional Information Distribution System (MIDS). The entire Typhoon fleet passed the 500,000 flying hours milestone in 2018. As of August 2019, a total of 623 orders had been received.

In July 2016, the ten-year Typhoon Total Availability Enterprise (TyTAN) support deal between the RAF and industry partners BAE and Leonardo was announced that aims to reduce the Typhoon's per-hour operating cost by 30 to 40 percent. This should equate to a saving of at least £550million ($712million), which "will be recycled into the programme" and, according to BAE, will result in the Typhoon having a per-hour operating cost "equivalent to a F-16".  By 2022 it was estimated that savings would be "over £500million."

Upgrades
In 2000, the UK selected the Meteor from MBDA as the long range air-to-air missile armament for its Typhoons with an in-service date (ISD) of December 2011. In December 2002, France, Germany, Spain and Sweden joined the British in a $1.9bn contract for Meteor on Typhoon, the Dassault Rafale and the Saab Gripen. The protracted contract negotiations pushed the ISD to August 2012, and it was further put back by Eurofighter's failure to make trials aircraft available to the Meteor partners. In 2014 the "second element of the Phase1 Enhancements package known as 'P1Eb'" was announced, allowing "Typhoon to realise both its air-to-air and air-to-ground capability to full effect".

In 2011 Flight International reported that budgetary pressures being encountered by the four original partner nations were limiting upgrades. For example, the four original partner nations were reluctant at that stage to fund enhancements that extend the aircraft's air-to-ground capability, such as integration of the MBDA Storm Shadow cruise missile.

Tranche 3 aircraft ESM/ECM enhancements have focused on improving radiating jamming power with antenna modifications, while EuroDASS is reported to offer a range of new capabilities, including the addition of a digital receiver, extending band coverage to low frequencies (VHF/UHF) and introducing an interferometric receiver with extremely precise geolocation functionalities. On the jamming side, EuroDASS is looking to low-band (VHF/UHF) jamming, more capable antennae, new ECM techniques, while protection against missile is to be enhanced through a new passive MWS in addition to the active devices already on board the aircraft. The latest support for self-protection will however originate from the new AESA radar which is to replace the Captor system, providing in a spiralled programme with passive, active and cyberwarfare RF capabilities. Selex ES has developed a self-contained expendable Digital Radio Frequency Memory (DRFM) jammer for fast jet aircraft known as BriteCloud which is being studied for integration on the Typhoon.

Eurojet is attempting to find funding to test thrust vectoring control (TVC) nozzles on a flight demonstrator. In April 2014, BAE announced new wind tunnel tests to assess the aerodynamic characteristics of conformal fuel tanks (CFTs). The CFTs, which can be fitted to any Tranche 3 aircraft, could carry 1,500 litres each to increase the Typhoon's combat radius by a factor of 25% to 1,500 n miles (2,778 km).

BAE has completed development of its Striker II Helmet-Mounted Display that builds on the capabilities of the original Striker Helmet-Mounted Display, which is already in service on the Typhoon. Striker II features a new display with more colour and can transition between day and night seamlessly eliminating the need for separate night vision goggles. In addition, the helmet can monitor the pilot's exact head position so it always knows exactly what information to display. The system is compatible with ANR, a 3-D audio threats system and 3-D communications; these are available as customer options. In 2015, BAE was awarded a £1.7million contract to study the feasibility of a common weapon launcher that could be capable of carrying multiple weapons and weapon types on a single pylon.

Also in 2015, Airbus flight tested a package of aerodynamic upgrades for the Eurofighter known as the Aerodynamic Modification Kit (AMK) consisting of reshaped (delta) fuselage strakes, extended trailing-edge flaperons and leading-edge root extensions. This increases wing lift by 25% resulting in an increased turn rate, tighter turning radius, and improved nose-pointing ability at low speed with angle of attack values around 45% greater and roll rates up to 100% higher. Eurofighter's Laurie Hilditch said these improvements should increase subsonic turn rate by 15% and give the Eurofighter the sort of "knife-fight in a phone box" turning capability enjoyed by rivals such as Boeing's F/A-18E/F or the Lockheed Martin F-16, without sacrificing the transonic and supersonic high-energy agility inherent to its delta wing-canard configuration. Eurofighter Project Pilot Germany Raffaele Beltrame said: "The handling qualities appeared to be markedly improved, providing more manoeuvrability, agility and precision while performing tasks representative of in-service operations. And it is extremely interesting to consider the potential benefits in the air-to-surface configuration thanks to the increased variety and flexibility of stores that can be carried."

In April 2016, Finmeccanica (now Leonardo) demonstrated the air-to-ground capabilities of its Mode5 Reverse-Identification friend or foe (IFF) system which showed that it is possible to give pilots the ability to distinguish between friendly and enemy platforms in a simple fashion using the aircraft's existing transponder. Finmeccanica said NATO is considering the system as a short- to mid-term solution for air-to-surface identification of friendly forces and thus avoid collateral damages due to friendly fire during close air support operations.

UK Project Centurion upgrades
With the confirmed retirement date of March 2019 for RAF Tornado GR4s, in 2014 the UK commenced an upgrade programme that would eventually become the £425 million Project Centurion to ensure the Typhoon was able to assume the precision strike duties of the ageing Tornado. The upgrade was delivered under different phases:
Phase 0 – initial multirole upgrades.
Phase 1/P2EA – MBDA Meteor integration and initial Storm Shadow Capability.
Phase 2/P3EA – Full Storm Shadow capability as well as Brimstone integration.

Phase 1 standard aircraft were used operationally for the first time as part of Operation Shader over Iraq and Syria in 2018. On 18 December 2018 the RAF approved release to service for the full Project Centurion package.

Proposed upgrade for German Tornado replacement
On 24 April 2018, Airbus announced its offer to replace Germany's Panavia Tornado fleet, proposing the integration of new weaponry, performance enhancements and additional capabilities to the Eurofighter Typhoon. This is similar to that being performed as part of the UK's Project Centurion. Integration of air-to-ground weapons already has begun on German Typhoons as part of Project Odin. Among the weapons being offered are the Kongsberg Joint Strike Missile for the anti-ship mission and the Taurus cruise missile.

The consortium is keen to make use of the engine's growth potential to boost thrust by around 15% as well as improve fuel efficiency and range. This will be combined with a new design and enlarged 1,800-litre fuel tank. The aircraft currently is fitted with 1,000-litre fuel tanks. Other modifications will include the Aerodynamic Modification Kit, test flown in 2014, to improve maneuverability and handling, particularly with heavy weapon loads. Eurofighter says it is comfortable with delivering integration of the U.S. B61 nuclear weapon onto the aircraft, a process that requires U.S. certification. Paltzo said he was confident the U.S. government would not use the certification requirements of the weapon as "leverage" to force Germany towards a U.S. platform. A next-generation electronic warfare suite has been planned by the four-country consortium.

In November 2019, Airbus proposed a SEAD capability for the aircraft, a role which is currently performed by the Tornado ECR in German service. The Typhoon ECR would be configured with two Escort Jammer pods under the wings and two Emitter Location Systems at the wing tips. Armament configuration would include four MBDA Meteor, two IRIS-T and six SPEAR-EW in addition to three drop tanks.

On 5 November 2020, the German government approved an order for 38 Tranche 4 with ground attack capabilities for the replacement of Tranche 1 units in German service.

Luftwaffe ordered 15 ECR electronic warfare aircraft for the Luftgestützte Wirkung im Elektromagnetischen Spektrum (luWES) requirement in March 2022.

Replacement
Germany is to replace the Eurofighter with the New Generation Fighter (NGF), co-developed with France and Spain. The BAE Systems Tempest is a ‘6th Generation’ fighter envisioned as a replacement for the RAF and Italian Air Force (AM), part of the UK's wider Future Combat Air System.

Design

Airframe overview

The Typhoon is a highly agile aircraft both at supersonic and at low speeds, achieved through having an intentionally relaxed stability design. It has a quadruplex digital fly-by-wire control system providing artificial stability, as manual operation alone could not compensate for the inherent instability. The fly-by-wire system is described as "carefree", and prevents the pilot from exceeding the permitted manoeuvre envelope. Roll control is primarily achieved by use of the ailerons. Pitch control is by operation of the canards and ailerons, because the canards disturb airflow to inner elevons (flaps). The yaw control is done by a large, single rudder. Engines are fed by a chin double intake ramp situated below a splitter plate.

The Typhoon features lightweight construction (82% composites consisting of 70% carbon fibre composite materials and 12% glass fibre reinforced composites) with an estimated lifespan of 6,000 flying hours.

Radar signature reduction features

Although not designated a stealth fighter, measures were taken to reduce the Typhoon's radar cross section (RCS), especially from the frontal aspect; An example of these measures is that the Typhoon has jet inlets that conceal the front of the engines (a strong radar target) from radar. Many important potential radar targets, such as the wing, canard and fin leading edges, are highly swept so they will reflect radar energy well away from the front. Some external weapons are mounted semi-recessed into the aircraft, partially shielding these missiles from incoming radar waves. In addition radar-absorbent materials (RAM), developed primarily by EADS/DASA, coat many of the most significant reflectors, such as the wing leading edges, the intake edges and interior, the rudder surrounds, and strakes.

The manufacturers carried out tests on the early Eurofighter prototypes to optimise the low observability characteristics of the aircraft from the early 1990s. Testing at Warton on the DA4 prototype measured the RCS of the aircraft and investigated the effects of a variety of RAM coatings and composites. Another measure to reduce the likelihood of discovery is the use of passive sensors (PIRATE IRST), which minimises the radiation of treacherous electronic emissions. While canards generally have poor stealth characteristics from side because of corner to hull, the flight control system is designed to maintain the elevon trim and canards at an angle at which they have the smallest RCS.

Cockpit

The Typhoon features a glass cockpit without any conventional instruments. It incorporates three full colour multi-function head-down displays (MHDDs) (the formats on which are manipulated by means of softkeys, XY cursor, and voice (Direct Voice Input or DVI) command), a wide angle head-up display (HUD) with forward-looking infrared (FLIR), a voice and hands-on throttle and stick (Voice+HOTAS), a Helmet Mounted Symbology System (HMSS), a MIDS, a manual data-entry facility (MDEF) located on the left glareshield and a fully integrated aircraft warning system with a dedicated warnings panel (DWP). Reversionary flying instruments, lit by LEDs, are located under a hinged right glareshield. Access to the cockpit is normally via either a telescopic integral ladder or an external version. The integral ladder is stowed in the port side of the fuselage, below the cockpit.

User needs were given a high priority in the cockpit's design; both layout and functionality was developed with feedback and assessments from military pilots and a specialist testing facility. The aircraft is controlled by means of a centre stick (or control stick) and left hand throttles, designed on a Hand on Throttle and Stick (HOTAS) principle to lower pilot workload. Emergency escape is provided by a Martin-Baker Mk.16A ejection seat, with the canopy being jettisoned by two rocket motors. The HMSS was delayed by years but should have been operational by late 2011. Standard g-force protection is provided by the full-cover anti-g trousers (FCAGTs), a specially developed g suit providing sustained protection up to nine g. German and Austrian Air Force pilots wear a hydrostatic g-suit called Libelle (dragonfly) Multi G Plus instead, which also provides protection to the arms, theoretically giving more complete g tolerance.

In the event of pilot disorientation, the Flight Control System allows for rapid and automatic recovery by the simple press of a button. On selection of this cockpit control the FCS takes full control of the engines and flying controls, and automatically stabilises the aircraft in a wings level, gentle climbing attitude at 300 knots, until the pilot is ready to retake control. The aircraft also has an Automatic Low-Speed Recovery system (ALSR) which prevents it from departing from controlled flight at very low speeds and high angle of attack. The FCS system is able to detect a developing low-speed situation and to raise an audible and visual low-speed cockpit warning. This gives the pilot sufficient time to react and to recover the aircraft manually. If the pilot does not react, however, or if the warning is ignored, the ALSR takes control of the aircraft, selects maximum dry power for the engines and returns the aircraft to a safe flight condition. Depending on the attitude, the FCS employs an ALSR "push", "pull" or "knife-over" manoeuvre.

The Typhoon Direct Voice Input (DVI) system uses a speech recognition module (SRM), developed by Smiths Aerospace and Computing Devices. It was the first production DVI system used in a military cockpit. DVI provides the pilot with an additional natural mode of command and control over approximately 26 non-critical cockpit functions, to reduce pilot workload, improve aircraft safety, and expand mission capabilities. An important step in the development of the DVI occurred in 1987 when Texas Instruments completed the TMS-320-C30, a digital signal-processor, enabling reductions in the size and system complexity required. The project was given the go-ahead in July 1997, with development carried out on the Eurofighter Active Cockpit Simulator at Warton. The DVI system is speaker-dependent, requiring each pilot to create a template. It is not used for safety-critical or weapon-critical tasks, such as weapon release or lowering of the undercarriage. Voice commands are confirmed by visual or aural feedback, and serves to reduce pilot workload. All functions are also achievable by means of a conventional button-press or soft-key selections; functions include display management, communications, and management of various systems. EADS Defence and Security in Spain has worked on a new non-template DVI module to allow for continuous speech recognition, speaker voice recognition with common databases (e.g. British English, American English, etc.) and other improvements.

BAE Systems has been awarded a contract to develop new touch screen displays in the cockpit and enhance data processing capability for Eurofighter Typhoon.

Avionics

Navigation is via both GPS and an inertial navigation system. The Typhoon can use Instrument Landing System (ILS) for landing in poor weather. The aircraft also features an enhanced ground proximity warning system (GPWS) based on the TERPROM Terrain Referenced Navigation (TRN) system used by the Panavia Tornado. MIDS provides a Link 16 data link.

The aircraft employs a sophisticated and highly integrated Defensive Aids Sub-System named Praetorian (formerly Euro-DASS) Praetorian monitors and responds automatically to air and surface threats, provides an all-round prioritised assessment, and can respond to multiple threats simultaneously. Threat detection methods include a Radar warning receiver (RWR), a missile warning system (MWS) and a laser warning receiver (LWR, only on UK Typhoons). Protective countermeasures consist of chaff, flares, an electronic countermeasures (ECM) suite and a towed radar decoy (TRD). The ESM-ECM and MWS consists of 16 antenna array assemblies and 10 radomes.

Traditionally each sensor in an aircraft is treated as a discrete source of information; however this can result in conflicting data and limits the scope for the automation of systems, hence increasing pilot workload. To overcome this, the Typhoon employs sensor fusion techniques. In the Typhoon, fusion of all data sources is achieved through the Attack and Identification System, or AIS. This combines data from the major on-board sensors along with any information obtained from off-board platforms such as AWACS and MIDS. Additionally the AIS integrates all the other major offensive and defensive systems (e.g. DASS & communications). The AIS physically comprises two essentially separate units: the Attack Computer (AC) and the Navigation Computer (NC).

By having a single source of information, pilot workload should be reduced by removing the possibility of conflicting data and the need for cross-checking, improving situational awareness and increasing systems automation. In practice the AIS should allow the Eurofighter to identify targets at distances in excess of 150 nmi and acquire and auto-prioritise them at over 100 nmi. In addition the AIS offers the ability to automatically control emissions from the aircraft, so called EMCON (from EMissions CONtrol). This should aid in limiting the detectability of the Typhoon by opposing aircraft further reducing pilot workload.

In 2017 a RAF Eurofighter Typhoon demonstrated interoperability with the F-35B using its Multifunction Advanced Data Link (MADL) in a two-week trial known as Babel Fish III, in the Mojave Desert. This was achieved by translating the MADL messages into Link 16 format, thus allowing an F-35 in stealth mode to communicate directly with the Typhoon.

Radar and sensors

Captor radar

The Euroradar Captor is a mechanical multi-mode pulse Doppler radar designed for the Eurofighter Typhoon. The Eurofighter operates automatic Emission Controls (EMCON) to reduce the electro-magnetic emissions of the current CAPTOR mechanically scanned radar. The Captor-M has three working channels, one intended for classification of jammer and for jamming suppression. A succession of radar software upgrades have enhanced the air-to-air capability of the radar. These upgrades have included the R2P programme (initially UK only, and known as T2P when 'ported' to the Tranche2 aircraft) which is being followed by R2Q/T2Q. R2P was applied to eight German Typhoons deployed on Red Flag Alaska in 2012.

Captor-E AESA variant
The Captor-E is an AESA derivative of the original Captor radar, also known as CAESAR (from Captor Active Electronically Scanned Array Radar) being developed by the Euroradar Consortium, led by Selex ES.

Synthetic Aperture Radar is expected to be fielded as part of the AESA radar upgrade which will give the Eurofighter an all-weather ground attack capability. The conversion to AESA will also give the Eurofighter a low probability of intercept radar with improved jam resistance. These include an innovative design with a gimbal to meet RAF requirements for a wider scan field than a fixed AESA. The coverage of a fixed AESA is limited to 120° in azimuth and elevation. A senior EADS radar expert has claimed that Captor-E is capable of detecting an F-35 from roughly 59 km away.

The first flight of a Eurofighter equipped with a "mass model" of the Captor-E occurred in late February 2014, with flight tests of the actual radar beginning in July of that year. On 19 November 2014 the contract to upgrade to the Captor-E was signed at the offices of EuroRadar lead Selex ES in Edinburgh, in a deal worth €1bn. Kuwait became the launch customer for the Captor-E active electronically scanned array radar in April 2016. Germany has announced the intention to integrate the AESA Captor-E into their Typhoons, beginning in 2022.

The AESA radar program for Eurofighter is now split into three European Common Radar System (ECRS) variants:
ECRS Mk0: also called Radar One Plus, this is the baseline Captor-E model which was developed by Leonardo. Hardware development is complete and it is fitted to aircraft delivered to Kuwait and Qatar.
ECRS Mk1: an upgrade of the Mk0 being developed by Hensoldt/Indra, for Germany and Spain. It will be retrofitted to their Tranche 2 and 3 aircraft, and also fitted to both countries' new Tranche 4 models.
ECRS Mk2: also known as Radar Two, a different version developed from the ARTS and Bright Adder demonstrators, and from the Gripen E's ES-05 Raven radar. With electronic warfare/attack capabilities, it is being developed by Leonardo for the RAF, and integrated by BAE Systems. It will initially be applied to Tranche 3 aircraft, but the RAF may upgrade Tranche 2 later. Italy has joined development of the ECRS Mk2, which was part of the Typhoon offer to Finland for its HX Fighter Program.

IRST

The Passive Infra-Red Airborne Track Equipment (PIRATE) system is an infrared search and track (IRST) system mounted on the port side of the fuselage, forward of the windscreen. Selex ES is the lead contractor which, along with Thales Optronics (system technical authority) and Tecnobit of Spain, make up the EUROFIRST consortium responsible for the system's design and development. Eurofighters starting with Tranche1 block5 have the PIRATE. The first Eurofighter Typhoon with PIRATE-IRST was delivered to the Italian Aeronautica Militare in August 2007. More advanced targeting capabilities can be provided with the addition of a targeting pod such as the Litening pod.

When used with the radar in an air-to-air role, it functions as an infrared search and track system, providing passive target detection and tracking. The system can detect variations in temperature at a long range. It also provides a navigation and landing aid. PIRATE is linked to the pilot's helmet-mounted display. It allows the detection of both hot exhaust plumes of jet engines and surface heating caused by friction; processing techniques further enhance the output, giving a near-high resolution image of targets. The output can be directed to any of the Multi-function Head Down Displays, and can also be overlaid on both the Helmet Mounted Sight and the Head Up Display.

Up to 200 targets can be simultaneously tracked using one of several different modes; Multiple Target Track (MTT), Single Target Track (STT), Single Target Track Ident (STTI), Sector Acquisition and Slaved Acquisition. In MTT mode the system will scan a designated volume space looking for potential targets. In STT mode PIRATE will provide tracking of a single designated target. An addition to this mode, STT Ident allows for visual identification of the target, the resolution being superior to CAPTOR's. When in Sector Acquisition mode PIRATE will scan a volume of space under direction of another onboard sensor such as CAPTOR. In Slave Acquisition, off-board sensors are used with PIRATE being commanded by data obtained from an AWACS or other source. When a target is found in either of these modes, PIRATE will automatically designate it and switch to STT.

Once a target has been tracked and identified, PIRATE can be used to cue an appropriately equipped short range missile, i.e. a missile with a high off-boresight tracking capability such as ASRAAM. Additionally the data can be used to augment that of Captor or off-board sensor information via the AIS. This should enable the Typhoon to overcome severe ECM environments and still engage its targets. PIRATE also has a passive ranging capability although the system remains limited when providing passive firing solutions, as it does not have a laser rangefinder.

Engines

The Eurofighter Typhoon is fitted with two Eurojet EJ200 engines, each capable of providing up to 60 kN (13,500 lbf) of dry thrust and >90 kN (20,230 lbf) with afterburners. Using the "war" setting, dry thrust increases by 15% to 69 kN per engine and afterburners by 5% to 95 kN per engine and for a few seconds, up to 102 kN thrust without damaging the engine. The EJ200 engine combines the leading technologies from each of the four European companies, using advanced digital control and health monitoring; wide chord aerofoils and single crystal turbine blades; and a convergent / divergent exhaust nozzle to give high thrust-to-weight ratio, multimission capability, supercruise performance, low fuel consumption, low cost of ownership, modular construction and growth potential.

The Typhoon is capable of supersonic cruise without using afterburners (referred to as supercruise). Air Forces Monthly gives a maximum supercruise speed of Mach 1.1 for the RAF FGR4 multirole version, however in a Singaporean evaluation, a Typhoon managed to supercruise at Mach 1.21 on a hot day with a combat load. Eurofighter states that the Typhoon can supercruise at Mach 1.5. As with the F-22, the Eurofighter can launch weapons while under supercruise to extend their ranges via this "running start". In 2007, the EJ200 engine had accumulated 50,000 Engine Flying Hours in service with the four Nation Air Forces (Germany, UK, Spain and Italy).

The EJ200 engine has the potential to be fitted with a thrust vectoring control (TVC) nozzle, which the Eurofighter and Eurojet consortium have been actively developing and testing, primarily for export but also for future upgrades of the fleet. TVC could reduce fuel burn on a typical Typhoon mission by up to 5%, as well as increase available thrust in supercruise by up to 7% and take-off thrust by 2%. Clemens Linden, Eurojet TURBO GmbH CEO, speaking at the 2018 Farnborough International Air Show, said "15 per cent more thrust would allow pilots to operate with a heavily loaded aircraft in the battlespace with the same performance levels as they have today. The technology insertion also provides more persistence – giving aircraft longer range or longer loitering time. To achieve more thrust we would increase the airflow and pressure ratios of the high and low pressure compressors and run higher temperatures in the turbines by using the latest generation single crystal turbine blade materials. And with higher aerodynamic efficiencies we can achieve a lower fuel burn. A third area of improvement would be the engine exhaust nozzle which would be upgraded with the installation of a 2-parametric version allowing independent and optimized adjustment of the throat and exit area at all flight conditions, providing fuel burn advantages. The technologies for the different components are at a Technology readiness level of between 7and 9. The nozzle has been at ITP in Spain on a test bed for 400 hours."

Performance
The Typhoon's combat performance, compared to the F-22 Raptor and F-35 Lightning II fighters and the French Dassault Rafale, has been the subject of much discussion. In March 2005, United States Air Force Chief of Staff General John P. Jumper, then the only person to have flown both the Eurofighter Typhoon and the Raptor, said:

In the 2005 Singapore evaluation, the Typhoon won all three combat tests, including one in which a single Typhoon defeated three RSAF F-16s, and reliably completed all planned flight tests. In July 2009, Former Chief of Air Staff for the RAF, Air Chief Marshal Sir Glenn Torpy, said that "The Eurofighter Typhoon is an excellent aircraft. It will be the backbone of the Royal Air Force along with the JSF."

In July 2007, Indian Air Force Su-30MKI fighters participated in the Indra-Dhanush exercise with the RAF's Typhoon. This was the first time the two fighters had taken part in such an exercise. The IAF did not allow their pilots to use the MKI's radar during the exercise to protect the highly classified Russian N011M Bars. The IAF pilots were impressed by the Typhoon's agility. In 2015, Indian Air Force Su-30MKIs again participated in a Indra-Dhanush exercise with RAF Typhoons.

Armament

The Typhoon is a multi-role fighter with maturing air-to-ground capabilities. The initial absence of air-to-ground capability is believed to have been a factor in the type's rejection from Singapore's fighter competition in 2005. At the time it was claimed that Singapore was concerned about the delivery timescale and the ability of the Eurofighter partner nations to fund the required capability packages. Tranche1 aircraft could drop laser-guided bombs in conjunction with third-party designators but the anticipated deployment of Typhoon to Afghanistan meant that the UK required self-contained bombing capabilities before the other partners. In 2006 the UK embarked on the £73m Change Proposal 193 (CP193) to give an "austere" air-to-surface capability using GBU-16 Paveway II and Rafael/Ultra Electronics Litening III laser designator for Tranche1 Block5 aircraft. Aircraft with this upgrade were designated Typhoon FGR4 by the RAF.

Similar capability was added to Tranche 2 aircraft on the main development pathway as part of the Phase1 Enhancements. P1Ea (SRP10) entered service in 2013 Q1 and added the use of Paveway IV, EGBU16 and the cannon against surface targets. P1Eb (SRP12) added full integration with GPS bombs such as GBU-10 Paveway II, GBU-16 Paveway II, Paveway IV and a new real-time operating system that allows multiple targets to be attacked in a single run. This new system will form the basis for future weapons integration by individual countries under the Phase2 Enhancements. The Storm Shadow and KEPD 350 (Taurus) cruise missiles, together with the Meteor Beyond Visual Range Air-to-Air missile flight trials had been successfully completed by January 2016. The Storm Shadow and Meteor firings are part of the Phase2 Enhancement (P2E) programme which introduced a range of new and improved long range attack capabilities to Typhoon. In addition to Meteor and Storm Shadow, the first live firing of MBDA's Brimstone air-to-surface missile, part of the Phase3 Enhancements (P3E) programme, was successfully completed in July 2017.

German aircraft can carry four GBU-48 1000 lb bombs.

An anti-ship capability has been studied but has not yet been contracted. Weapon options for this role could include Boeing Harpoon, MBDA Marte, "Sea Brimstone", and RBS-15.

The Typhoon also carries a specially developed variant of the Mauser BK-27 27 mm cannon that was developed originally for the Panavia Tornado. This is a single-barrel, electrically fired, gas-operated revolver cannon with a new linkless feed system is located in the starboard wing root, and is capable of firing up to 1700 rounds per minute. There was a proposal on cost grounds in 1999 to limit UK gun-armament fit to the first 53 batch-1 aircraft and not used operationally, but this decision was reversed in 2006.

In addition to its air to ground armament; the Typhoon can carry a mixture of air to air weaponry to fulfill its role as an air superiority fighter. This includes the ASRAAM, IRIS-T, and the AIM-9 Sidewinder heat seeking missiles; and the AIM-120 AMRAAM and the MBDA Meteor beyond visual range radar guided missiles. Under Tranche 2, Block 15 EOC (Enhanced Operational Capability) 2; the Meteor was integrated into the Typhoon's arsenal. This similar capability was achieved in the RAF under "Project Centurion"; with 107 Tranche 2 and 3 Typhoons modified to be capable to use the Meteor along with Brimstone and Storm Shadow air to ground missiles.

Operational history

Austrian Air Force (Luftstreitkräfte)

In 2002, Austria selected the Typhoon as its new air defence aircraft, it having beaten the F-16 and the Saab Gripen in competition. The purchase of 18 Typhoons was agreed on 1 July 2003, however this was reduced to 15 in June 2007. The first aircraft (7L-WA) was delivered on 12 July 2007 to Zeltweg Air Base and formally entered service with the Austrian Air Force. A 2008 report by the Austrian government oversight office, the Rechnungshof, calculated that instead of getting 18 Tranche2 jets at a price of €109million each, as stipulated by the original contract, the revised deal agreed by Minister Darabos meant that Austria was paying an increased unit price of €114million for 15 partially used, Tranche1 jets. In July 2008, the Luftstreitkräfte assigned the Eurofighter to Quick Reaction Alert (QRA) duties, by the end of the year they had been scrambled 73 times.

Austrian prosecutors are investigating allegations that up to €100million was made available to lobbyists to influence the original purchase decision in favour of the Eurofighter. By October 2013, all Typhoons in service with Austria had been upgraded to the latest Tranche1 standard. In 2014, due to defence budget restrictions, there were only 12 pilots available to fly the 15 aircraft in Austria's Air Force. In February 2017, Austrian Defence Minister Hans Peter Doskozil accused Airbus of fraudulent intent following a probe that allegedly unveiled corruption linked to the order of Typhoon jets.

In July 2017, the Austria Defence Ministry announced that it would be replacing all its Typhoon aircraft by 2020. The ministry said continued use of its Typhoons over their 30-year life span would cost about €5billion with the bulk being for maintenance. By comparison it is estimated that buying and operating a new fleet of 15 single-seat and three twin-seat fighters would save €2billion over that period. Austria plans to explore a government-to-government sale or lease agreement to avoid a lengthy and costly tender process with a manufacturer. Possible replacements include the Gripen and the F-16.

On 20 July 2020, a letter written by Indonesia's defence minister, Prabowo Subianto, was published by Indonesian news outlets expressing interest in acquiring Austria's entire fleet of Typhoon jets.

German Air Force (Luftwaffe)

On 4 August 2003, the German Air Force accepted its first series production Eurofighter (30+03) starting the replacement process of the Mikoyan MiG-29s inherited from the East German Air Force. The first Luftwaffe Wing to accept the Eurofighter was Jagdgeschwader 73 "Steinhoff" on 30 April 2004 at Rostock–Laage Airport. The second Wing was Jagdgeschwader 74 (JG74) on 25 July 2006, with four Eurofighters arriving at Neuburg Air Base, beginning the replacement of JG74's McDonnell Douglas F-4F Phantom IIs.

The Luftwaffe assigned their Eurofighters to QRA on 3 June 2008, taking over from the F-4F Phantom II.

On 28 October 2014, while deployed to Ämari Air Base in Estonia as part of the NATO Baltic Air Policing mission, German Eurofighters scrambled and intercepted seven Russian Air Force aircraft over the Baltic Sea.

The Luftwaffe once again provided Baltic Air Policing at Ämari Air Base between 31 August 2020 and April 2021, having taken over from Dassault Mirage 2000-5Fs of the French Air and Space Force.

Italian Air Force (Aeronautica Militare)
On 16 December 2005, the F-2000 Typhoon reached initial operational capability (IOC) with the Italian Air Force (Aeronautica Militare). Its F-2000 Typhoons were put into service as air defence fighters at the Grosseto Air Base, and immediately assigned to QRA at the same base.

On 17 July 2009, Italian Air Force F-2000A Typhoons were deployed to protect Albania's airspace. On 29 March 2011, Italian Air Force Eurofighter Typhoons began flying combat air patrol missions in support of NATO's Operation Unified Protector in Libya.

Between January and August 2015, four Aeronautica Militare F-2000A Typhoons (from 36º and 37º Stormo) were deployed to Šiauliai Air Base in northern Lithuania as part of the Baltic Air Policing mission.

Kuwait Air Force
On 11 September 2015, Eurofighter confirmed that an agreement had been reached to supply Kuwait with 28 aircraft. On 1March 2016, the Kuwaiti National Assembly approved the procurement of 22 single-seat and six twin-seat Typhoons. On 5April 2016, Kuwait signed a contract with Leonardo valued at €7.957billion ($9.062billion) for the supply of the 28 aircraft, all to tranche 3 standard. The Kuwaiti aircraft will be the first Typhoons to receive the Captor-E AESA radar, with two instrumented production aircraft from the UK and Germany currently undergoing ground-based integration trials. The Typhoons will be fitted with Leonardo's Praetorian defensive aids suite and PIRATE infrared search and track system. The contract involves the production of aircraft in Italy and covers logistics, operational support and the training of flight crews and ground personnel. It also encompasses infrastructure work at the Ali Al Salem Air Base, where the Typhoons will be based. Aircraft deliveries will begin in 2020.

Qatar Emiri Air Force
From January 2011 the Qatar Emiri Air Force (QEAF) evaluated the Typhoon, alongside the Boeing F/A-18E/F Super Hornet, the McDonnell Douglas F-15E Strike Eagle, the Dassault Rafale, and the Lockheed Martin F-35 Lightning II, to replace its then inventory of Dassault Mirage 2000-5s. On 30 April 2015 Qatar announced that it would order 24 Rafales.

In December 2017 a deal for Qatar to buy 24 jets and a support and training package from BAE was announced, scheduled to begin in 2022. In September 2018, Qatar made the first payment for the procurement of 24 Eurofighter Typhoons and nine BAE Systems Hawk aircraft to BAE.

Royal Air Force

The UK's first Typhoon Development Aircraft (DA-2) ZH588 made its maiden flight on 6April 1994 from Warton. On 1September 2002, No. XVII (Reserve) Squadron was reformed at Warton as the Typhoon Operational Evaluation Unit (TOEU), receiving its first aircraft on 18 December 2003. The first RAF production aircraft to take to the air was ZJ800 (BT001) on 14 February 2003, completing a 21-minute flight. The next Typhoon squadron to be formed was No. 29 (R) Squadron which formed as the Typhoon Operational Conversion Unit (OCU). The first operational RAF Typhoon squadron to be formed was No.3 (Fighter) Squadron on 31 March 2006, when it moved to RAF Coningsby.

No. 3 (F) Squadron Typhoon F2s took over QRA responsibilities from the Panavia Tornado F3 on 29 June 2007, initially alternating with the Tornado F3 every month. On 9August 2007, the UK's MoD reported that No. XI (F) Squadron of the RAF, which stood up as a Typhoon squadron on 29 March 2007, had taken delivery of its first two multi-role Typhoons. Two of No. XI (F) Squadron's Typhoons were sent to intercept a Russian Tupolev Tu-95 approaching British airspace on 17 August 2007. The RAF Typhoons were declared combat ready in the air-to-ground role by 1July 2008. The RAF Typhoons were projected to be ready to deploy for operations by mid-2008.

In late 2009, four RAF Typhoon FGR4s were deployed to RAF Mount Pleasant, replacing the Tornado F3s of No. 1435 Flight defending the Falkland Islands. No.6 Squadron stood up at RAF Leuchars on 6September 2010, making Leuchars the second RAF base to operate the Typhoon.

On 20 March, ten Typhoons from RAF Coningsby and RAF Leuchars arrived at the Gioia del Colle airbase in southern Italy to enforce a no-fly zone in Libya alongside Panavia Tornado GR4s. On 21 March, RAF Typhoons flew their first-ever combat mission while patrolling the no-fly zone. On 29 March, it was revealed that the RAF was having to divert personnel from Typhoon training to meet the shortfall in pilots available to fly the required number of sorties over Libya.

On 12 April 2011, a RAF Typhoon and a Tornado GR4 dropped precision-guided bombs on ground vehicles operated by Gaddafi forces. The RAF said that each aircraft dropped one GBU-16 Paveway II 454 kg (1,000 lb) laser-guided bomb which struck "very successfully and very accurately [and this] represented] a significant milestone in the delivery of multi-role Typhoon." Target designation was provided by the Tornados with their Litening III targeting pods due to the lack of Typhoon pilots trained in air-to-ground missions.

The National Audit Office observed in 2011 that the distribution of the Eurofighter's parts supply and repairs over several countries has led to parts shortages, long timescales for repairs, and the cannibalisation of some aircraft to keep others flying. The UK's then Defence Secretary Liam Fox admitted on 14 April 2011 that Britain's Eurofighter Typhoon jets were grounded in 2010 due to shortage of spare parts. The RAF "cannibalised" aircraft for spare parts in a bid to keep the maximum number of Typhoons operational on any given day. The MoD warned that the problems were likely to continue until 2015.

On 15 September 2012, No.1 (F) Squadron stood up at RAF Leuchars, joining No.6 Squadron as the second Typhoon unit to operate in Scotland. On 22 April 2013, No. 41 (R) Test and Evaluation Squadron (TES) began operating the Typhoon from RAF Coningbsy.

By July 2014, a dozen RAF Tranche 2 Typhoons had been upgraded with Phase1 Enhancement (P1E) capability to enable them to use the Paveway IV guided bomb; the Tranche1 version had used the GBU-12 Paveway II in combat over Libya, but the Paveway IV can be set to explode above or beneath a target and to hit at a set angle.

No. II (AC) Squadron became the fifth RAF Typhoon squadron on 12 January 2015 at RAF Lossiemouth. In July 2015, it was reported that Typhoons from No. II (AC) Squadron were training with Type 45 destroyers in an Air-Maritime Integration (AMI) role, conceding that the service had recently neglected the role following the decommissioning of the Nimrod Maritime Patrol aircraft. In the 2015 Strategic Defence and Security Review (SDSR), the UK decided to retain some of the Tranche1 aircraft to increase the number of front-line squadrons from five to seven and to extend the out-of-service date from 2030 to 2040 as well as implementing the Captor-E AESA radar in later tranches. In 2015 Typhoons were deployed to Malta as security for the Commonwealth Heads of Government Meeting.

On 3December 2015, six Typhoon FGR4s deployed to RAF Akrotiri to support operations against ISIL. The following evening the Typhoons, accompanied by Tornados, attacked targets in Syria.

In October 2016, four Typhoon FGR4s from No. II (AC) Squadron, supported by an Airbus Voyager KC3 aerial tanker and a Boeing C-17 Globemaster III, deployed to Misawa Air Base in Japan for the first bilateral exercises with non-US forces hosted by the JASDF.

On 14 December 2017, it was announced No. 12 (B) Squadron would stand as a joint RAF/Qatari Air Force squadron, with the Qatari crew temporarily operating Typhoons to prepare them for their own Typhoon deliveries in 2022. On 29 January 2018, the RAF announced that 16 twin-seat Typhoons would undergo the Return to Produce (RTP) process in an effort to save £800million, with each airframe producing £50m of spare parts. This move also reflected the switch from two-seat trainer to single-seat pilot training and greater use of training simulators. In addition, the two-seat airframes were primarily from Tranche1 and could not be equipped with Tranche3 and later upgrades such as Captor-E.

On 1 April 2019, No. IX (B) Squadron officially converted from the Tornado GR4 to the Typhoon FGR4, becoming an aggressor and air defence squadron at Lossiemouth. In April, four Typhoons of No. XI (F) Squadron deployed from RAF Coningsby to Ämari Airbase, Estonia, to undergo a four month long NATO Baltic policing mission (Op AZOTIZE). Five Typhoons of No.6 Squadron participated in the Arctic Challenge Exercise (ACE) in Sweden from 22 May to 4June. No. 12 Squadron were assigned their first Typhoon FGR4 in July 2019. The 160th, and last, Typhoon (ZK437) was delivered to the RAF on 27 September 2019.

Between April and September 2020, No. 6 Squadron deployed to Šiauliai Air Base, Lithuania, as part of Operation Azotize. While deployed the squadron participated in Exercise BALTOPs 2020. In July 2020, No. 12 Squadron began operating as a joint RAF-QEAF unit at RAF Coningsby.

On 22 March 2021, the 2021 Defence Command Paper announced the retirement of all Tranche 1 Typhoons by 2025, with the remaining fleet being upgraded.

Also in 2021, the UK launched the P3Ec package, due for delivery in 2024, including several upgrades, including replacing the MFDs with a Large Area Display (LAD).

On 14 December 2021, the RAF executed its first operational air-to-air engagement with a Typhoon, shooting down a small hostile drone with an ASRAAM near the Al-Tanf coalition base in Syria.

On 7 September 2022 during the joint UK/US SinkEx 'Atlantic Thunder' a 41 Squadron Typhoon successfully hit the ex-USS Boone with Paveway IVs, becoming the first RAF Typhoon to strike a naval target with live ordnance.

Royal Air Force of Oman
During the 2008 Farnborough Airshow it was announced that Oman was in an "advanced stage" of discussions to order Typhoons as a replacement for its SEPECAT Jaguar aircraft. On 21 December 2012, the Royal Air Force of Oman (RAFO) became the Typhoon's seventh customer when BAE and Oman announced an order for 12 Typhoons to enter service in 2017. The first of the Typhoons (plus Hawk Mk 166) ordered by Oman were "formally presented to the customer" on 15 May 2017. This included a flypast by a RAFO Typhoon.

Royal Saudi Air Force

In August 2006, Saudi Arabia confirmed it had agreed to purchase 72 Typhoons for The Royal Saudi Air Force (RSAF). In December 2006, it was reported in The Guardian that Saudi Arabia had threatened to buy Rafales because of a UK Serious Fraud Office (SFO) investigation into the Al Yamamah defence deals which commenced in the 1980s.

On 14 December 2006, Britain's attorney general, Lord Goldsmith, ordered that the SFO discontinue its investigation into BAE Systems' alleged bribery of senior Saudi officials in the Al-Yamamah contracts, citing "the need to safeguard national and international security". The Times raised the possibility that RAF production aircraft would be diverted as early Saudi Arabian aircraft, with the RAF forced to wait for its full complement of aircraft. This arrangement would mirror the diversion of RAF Tornados to the RSAF. The Times also reported that such an arrangement would make the UK purchase of its Tranche3 commitments more likely. On 17 September 2007, Saudi Arabia confirmed it had signed a £4.43 billion contract for 72 aircraft. 24 aircraft would be at the Tranche2 build standard, previously destined for the UK RAF, the first being delivered in 2008. The remaining 48 aircraft were to be assembled in Saudi Arabia and delivered from 2011, however following contract renegotiations in 2011, it was agreed that all 72 aircraft would be assembled by BAE Systems in the UK, with the last 24 aircraft being built to Tranche3 capability.

On 29 September 2008, the United States Department of State approved the Typhoon sale, required because of a certain technology governed by the ITAR process which was incorporated into the MIDS of the Eurofighter.

On 22 October 2008, the first RSAF Typhoon made its maiden flight at Warton. Since 2010, BAE has been training Saudi Arabian personnel at Warton.

By 2011, 24 Tranche 2 Eurofighter Typhoons had been delivered to Saudi Arabia, consisting of 18 single-seat and six two-seat aircraft. After that, BAE and Riyadh entered into discussions over configurations and price of the rest of the 72-plane order. On 19 February 2014, BAE announced that the Saudis had agreed to a price increase. BAE announced that the last of the original 72 Typhoons had been delivered to Saudi Arabia in June 2017.

RSAF Typhoons are playing a central role in the Saudi-led bombing campaign in Yemen. In February 2015, Saudi Typhoons attacked ISIS targets over Syria using Paveway IV bombs for the first time.

On 9March 2018, a memorandum of intent for the additional 48 Typhoons was signed during Saudi Crown Prince Mohammed bin Salman's visit to the United Kingdom, however the deal has not been completed due to German arms sanctions implemented in November 2018 in response to the assassination of Jamal Khashoggi.

Spanish Air and Space Force

The first Spanish production Eurofighter Tifón to fly was CE.16-01 (ST001) on 17 February 2003, flying from Getafe Air Base. The Spanish Air and Space Force assigned their Typhoons to QRA responsibilities in July 2008.

On 7 August 2018, a Spanish Air and Space Force Typhoon, on a training exercise near Otepää in Estonia, released an AMRAAM missile by mistake. There were no casualties, but the ten-day search operation for missile remains was unsuccessful and the status of the missile is unknown, whether it self-destructed in the air or landed unexploded and left a hazardous situation for the public. The pilot was disciplined for negligence, but received only the minimum penalty in the light of undisclosed mitigating circumstances.

Sales and marketing

Belgium
The Eurofighter Typhoon was one of the contenders to replace Belgium's fleet of ageing F-16A/B MLU's by 2023. Other contenders include the SAAB Gripen-E/F, Dassault Rafale, F/A-18E/F Super Hornet and F-35A Lightning II.

On 25 October 2018, Belgium officially selected the offer for 34 F-35As to replace the current fleet of around 54 F-16s. Government officials said the decision to select the F-35 over the Eurofighter Typhoon came down to price, stating that "The offer from the Americans was the best in all our seven valuation criteria." The total purchasing price for the aircraft and its support until 2030 totaled €4billion, €600million cheaper than the initially budgeted €4.6billion.

Denmark
The Royal Danish Air Force held a competition to replace its ageing fleet of F-16s in which the Eurofighter Typhoon, Boeing F/A-18F Super Hornet and the F-35 Lightning II were assessed. Denmark is a level-3 partner in the Joint Strike Fighter programme, and had already invested $200million. On 12 May 2016 the Danish government recommended that 27 F-35A fighters, instead of 34 Typhoons, should be procured.

Singapore
In 2005 the Eurofighter was a contender for Singapore's next generation fighter requirement competing with the Boeing F-15SG and the Dassault Rafale. The Eurofighter was eliminated from the competition in June 2005.

South Korea

In 2002, the Republic of Korea Air Force (ROKAF) chose the F-15K Slam Eagle over the Dassault Rafale, Eurofighter Typhoon and Sukhoi Su-35 for its 40 aircraft F-X Phase I fighter competition. During 2012–13, the Typhoon competed with the Boeing F-15SE Silent Eagle and the F-35 for the ROKAF's F-X Phase III fighter competition. In November 2013, it was announced that the ROKAF will purchase 40 F-35As.

Others
According to Eurofighter World magazine, Bangladesh, Egypt, Finland and Switzerland were among countries interested in acquiring the Eurofighter Typhoon. In mid-2021, it was reported that the Lockheed Martin F-35 was selected in Switzerland's $6.5 billion fighter competition, beating bids from Eurofighter, Dassault, and Boeing.

Finland was offered partner status in the Eurofighter Typhoon programme as part of the consortium's bid for Finland's HX Fighter Program competition, reported British magazine Janes on 6 July 2021. As part of Finland's HX offering, BAE Systems proposed a new  Large Area Display (LAD) to replace the three multi-function head-down displays (MHDDs). On 10 December 2021 Finland officially selected the F-35A as the country's next fighter.

Other countries have expressed interest in the fighter jet, Serbia and Ukraine being amongst them. Türkiye has also expressed interest amid US hesitance on delivering the latest block F-16s and started negotiations with the UK.

Variants

The Eurofighter is produced in single-seat and twin-seat variants. The twin-seat variant is not used operationally, but only for training, though it is combat capable. The aircraft has been manufactured in three major standards; seven Development Aircraft (DA), seven production standard Instrumented Production Aircraft (IPA) for further system development, and a continuing number of Series Production Aircraft. The production aircraft are now operational with the partner nation's air forces.

The Tranche 1 aircraft were produced from 2000 onwards. Aircraft capabilities are being increased incrementally, with each software upgrade resulting in a different standard, known as blocks. With the introduction of the block5 standard, the R2 retrofit programme began to bring all Tranche1 aircraft to that standard.

Operators

 
 Austrian Air Force – 15 delivered and 3 more ordered as of October 2022.
 Überwachungsgeschwader, at Zeltweg Air Base

 
 German Air Force – 143 Tranche 1 to Tranche 3 aircraft ordered, and all delivered. Two lost in a collision. In November 2020, Germany ordered 38 new Tranche 4 fighters. The latest order from Germany secures production of the Typhoon until 2030. In March 2022, Germany announced its intention to order 15 Typhoon ECR/SEAD equipped for electronic warfare purposes becoming the first customer of the new subtype.
 Taktisches Luftwaffengeschwader 71 "Richthofen", at Wittmundhafen Air Base
 Taktisches Luftwaffengeschwader 73 "Steinhoff", at Laage Air Base, OCU formation
 Taktisches Luftwaffengeschwader 74, at Neuburg Air Base
 Taktisches Luftwaffengeschwader 31 "Boelcke", at Nörvenich Air Base

 Italian Air Force – 96 ordered with 96 delivered and 94 in operation as of December 2022. (one lost in a demonstration flight crash).
 4º Stormo "Amedeo d'Aosta" (4th Wing), at Grosseto Air Base
 9° Gruppo Caccia (9th Fighter Squadron)
 20° Gruppo OCU Caccia (20th Fighter Operational Conversion Squadron)
 36° Stormo "Riccardo Hellmuth Seidl" (36th Wing), at Gioia del Colle Air Base
 10° Gruppo Caccia (10th Fighter Squadron)
 12° Gruppo Caccia (12th Fighter Squadron)
 37° Stormo "Cesare Toschi" (37th Wing), at Trapani Air Base
 18° Gruppo Caccia (18th Fighter Squadron)
 51° Stormo "Ferruccio Serafini" (51st Wing), at Istrana Air Base
 132° Gruppo Caccia (132nd Fighter Squadron)

Kuwait Air Force – 28 ordered with 6 delivered as of 29 September 2022.

Royal Air Force of Oman – 12 ordered in December 2012 with all delivered by June 2018.
No. 8 Squadron at RAFO Adam

Qatar Emiri Air Force – 24 ordered
RAF Coningsby, Lincolnshire, United Kingdom (from July 2020)
No. 12 Squadron RAF, joint RAF/Qatar Emiri Air Force squadron

Royal Saudi Air Force – 71 aircraft in operation as of June 2018 from 72 delivered.
King Fahad Air Base, Taif
No. 3 Squadron
No. 10 Squadron
No. 80 Squadron

 
 Spanish Air and Space Force – 73 ordered, all of which have been delivered by October 2020 with 70 in operation as of October 2020. Spain is planning to order 40 more Tranche 3+ and Tranche 4 Eurofighters to replace its F-18 Hornets. In June 2022, it ordered 20 Tranche 4.
 Ala 11, at Seville-Morón Air Base
 111 Escuadrón
 113 Escuadrón, OCU Tactical pilot training and evaluation
 Ala 14, at Albacete-Los Llanos Air Base
 142 Escuadrón

 
Royal Air Force – 160 ordered, all of which had been delivered by September 2019.  As of 1 April 2020, the RAF had 139 aircraft with 101 in service.
RAF Coningsby, Lincolnshire, England
No. 3 (F) Squadron
No. XI (F) Squadron
No. 12 Squadron, joint RAF/Qatar Air Force squadron
No. 29 Squadron, OCU Tactical pilot training and evaluation
No. 41 Test and Evaluation Squadron
RAF Lossiemouth, Moray, Scotland
No. 1 (F) Squadron
No. II (AC) Squadron
No. 6 Squadron
No. IX (B) Squadron
RAF Mount Pleasant, East Falkland, Falkland Islands
No. 1435 Flight
Past Units
No. 17 (R) Test & Evaluation Squadron, Operational Evaluation Unit (Operated between 2003 and 2013)

Accidents
On 21 November 2002, the Spanish twin-seat Typhoon prototype DA-6 crashed due to a double engine flameout caused by surges of the two engines at 45,000 ft.
On 23 April 2008, a RAF Typhoon FGR4 from 17 Squadron at RAF Coningsby (ZJ943), made a wheels–up landing at the US Navy's NAWS China Lake, in the United States. The aircraft was severely damaged however the pilot from 17 Squadron did not sustain any significant injury. It is thought the pilot may have forgotten to deploy the undercarriage or that for some reason he was not alerted to the undercarriage having not been deployed.
On 24 August 2010, a Spanish twin-seat Typhoon crashed at Spain's Morón Air Base moments after take-off for a routine training flight. It was being piloted by a RSAF pilot, who was killed, and a Spanish Air Force Major, who ejected safely. In September 2010 the German Air Force grounded its 55 planes and the RAF temporarily grounded all Typhoon training flights amidst concerns that after ejecting successfully the pilot had fallen to his death. On 21 September, the RAF announced that the harness system had been sufficiently modified to enable routine flying from RAF Coningsby. The Austrian Air Force also said all its aircraft had been cleared for flight. On 24 August 2010, the ejection seat manufacturer Martin Baker commented: "...under certain conditions, the quick release fitting could be unlocked using the palm of the hand, rather than the thumb and fingers, and that this posed a risk of inadvertent release", adding that a modification had been rapidly developed and approved "to eliminate this risk" and was being fitted to all Typhoon seats.
On 9 June 2014, the Spanish Air Force announced that a Typhoon had crashed at Spain's Morón Air Base on landing after a routine training flight. The sole pilot, Captain Fernando Lluna Carrascosa of the Spanish Air Force, who had over 600 Eurofighter flying hours, died in the crash.
On 23 June 2014, a Typhoon of the German Air Force suffered a mid-air collision with a Learjet 35A, which crashed near Olsberg, Germany. The severely damaged Eurofighter made a safe landing at Nörvenich Air Base, while the Learjet crashed with the two onboard killed.
On 1 September 2017, a RAF Typhoon overran the runway on landing at Pardubice Airport, Czech Republic, after diverting for bad weather.
On 14 September 2017, a RSAF aircraft crashed on a combat mission in Yemen's Abhyan province, killing its pilot. According to the Saudi Government, the aircraft crashed due to technical reasons and the pilot did not survive.
On 24 September 2017, an Italian Air Force aircraft crashed during an airshow in Terracina, Lazio, Italy. The pilot did not eject and died in the accident. The Italian Air Force said the jet completed a loop but then failed to get enough lift as it approached sea level and hit the water just a few hundred metres offshore.
On 12 October 2017, a Spanish Air Force Typhoon crashed near its base at Los Llanos Albacete, Spain, when returning from the military parade for the Spanish National Day. The pilot was killed.
On 24 June 2019, two German Air Force aircraft collided mid-air during an exercise in the region of Müritz in Mecklenburg-Vorpommern in northern Germany. Both aircraft were lost while the pilots ejected. The two planes were based at Laage, home to the "Steinhoff" Tactical Air Force Wing 73. Neither plane was carrying weapons. One of the pilots died.
On 14 December 2022, an Italian Air Force Typhoon of 37 Stormo crashed during the landing sequence into Trapani Air Base Sicily. The aircraft had been conducting a training mission with another Typhoon which landed safely. The Pilot was killed during the crash.

Aircraft on display
Germany
98+29 EF2000 Prototype DA-1 on display at the Deutsches Museum Flugwerft Schleissheim, Munich.

Italy
MMX603 EF2000 Prototype DA-7 on display at Cameri Air Base, Cameri.

United Kingdom
ZH588 EF2000 Prototype DA-2 on display at the Royal Air Force Museum London, Hendon, England.
ZH590 EF2000(T) Prototype DA-4 on display at the Newark Air Museum, Nottinghamshire, England.

Specifications

See also

References

Notes

Citations

Bibliography

Boot, Roy. From Spitfire to Eurofighter: 45 years of Combat Aircraft Design. Shrewsbury, UK: AirLife Publishing Ltd., 1990. .
Buttler, Tony. British Secret Projects: Jet Fighters Since 1950. Hinckley, UK: Midland Publishing, 2000. .

Harkins, Hugh. Eurofighter 2000, Europe's Fighter for the New Millennium (Aerofax 6). Earl Shilton, UK: Midland Publishing, 2006, First edition 1997. .
Matthews, Henry. Prelude to Eurofighter: EAP (Experimental Aircraft Programme) (X-Planes Profile-1). Beirut, Lebanon: HPM (Henry Paul Matthews) Publications, 2000.
Richardson, Doug. Stealth Warplanes: Deception, Evasion and Concealment in the Air. London: Salamander, 2001. .
Spick, Mike. "Eurofighter EF 2000 Typhoon". Brassey's Modern Fighters: The Ultimate Guide to In-Flight Tactics, Technology, Weapons, and Equipment. Washington, DC: Potomac Books Inc, 2002. .
Spick, Mike. "Eurofighter Typhoon". The Great Book of Modern Warplanes. St. Paul, Minnesota USA: MBI Publishing Company, 2000. .
Williams, Mel, ed. "Dassault Rafale". Superfighters, The Next Generation of Combat Aircraft. London: AIRtime, 2002. .

External links 

 
 Typhoon FGR4 on the Royal Air Force website
 Austrian Air Force Eurofighter page 
 Luftwaffe Eurofighter 
 

 
Typhoon
Delta-wing aircraft
Canard aircraft
Relaxed-stability aircraft
Twinjets
1990s international fighter aircraft
Articles containing video clips
Aircraft first flown in 1994